Harmony is an unincorporated community to the south-east of Atoka in Atoka County, Oklahoma, United States. Harmony has a small, K-8 school located in the community. Students of high school age either go to Atoka, Stringtown, or Tushka high schools.

Harmony also has a country store and a volunteer fire department. The fire department has recently gotten one new truck and are expecting another within the year. This brings their total to five trucks and 12 firemen, who have recently all gone through firefighter 1 classes and two of the fireman just became state certified first responders. The fire department has plans on continuing to work on lowering the ISO rating for the community and trying to keep the community safe.

Unincorporated communities in Atoka County, Oklahoma
Unincorporated communities in Oklahoma

io:Atoka, Oklahoma